Jules Prosper París, SJ (1 September 1846 – 13 May 1931) was a French prelate of the Roman Catholic Church, who served as Apostolic Vicar of Nanking from 1900 until his death.

Born in Nantes, he was ordained as a Jesuit priest on 18 September 1880, at age 34.

On 6 April 1900 París was appointed Apostolic Vicar of Kiangnan and Titular bishop of Silandus by Pope Leo XIII. He received his episcopal consecration on the following 11 November from Bishop Paul-Marie Reynaud, CM, with Bishops Jules-Auguste Coqset, CM, and Joseph-Claude Excoffier, MEP, serving as co-consecrators.

The vicarate was renamed twice during París's tenure, as Kiangsu (8 August 1921) and later Nanking (1 May 1922). París died at age 84.

References
 David Strong, A Call to Mission -- A History of the Jesuits in China 1842-1954. Volume 1: The French Romance, ATF Press, 2018.

External links
Catholic-Hierarchy

1846 births
1931 deaths
Clergy from Nantes
French Jesuits
20th-century Roman Catholic bishops in China
French expatriates in China
French Roman Catholic bishops in Asia
20th-century French Roman Catholic bishops